Varney Pas Boakay (born 16 January 1983) is a Liberian footballer. He stayed in East Java, Indonesia. His former clubs are club Persibo and Persela. With Persela, he played in Indonesia Super League.

References

External links

1983 births
Living people
Liberian footballers
Liberia international footballers
Expatriate footballers in Indonesia
Sportspeople from Monrovia

Association football forwards